Club Deportivo Beniel is a football team based in Beniel, Murcia. Founded in 1976, the team plays in Tercera División – Group 13. 

The club's home ground is Estadio Villa de Beniel.

Season to season

18 seasons in Tercera División

Honours

 Tercera División

Winners (1): 1991–92

External links
futbolme.com profile

Football clubs in the Region of Murcia
Association football clubs established in 1976
1976 establishments in Spain